PDAC may refer to:

Pancreatic ductal adenocarcinoma, a type of pancreatic cancer
Prospectors & Developers Association of Canada
Psychopharmacologic Drugs Advisory Committee of the FDA
Communist Alternative Party, Italian political party